Xinban Special District, also known as New Banqiao Station Special Zone, is located in Banqiao District, New Taipei, Taiwan. The total area of Xinban Special District is 54 hectares. It was designed in the 1990s and developed from the 2000s onward, when New Taipei was still Taipei County. Xinban Special District is the prime central business district, administration center, shopping center, and transport hub of New Taipei City. Important infrastructure, such as Banqiao station, New Taipei City Hall, New Taipei Citizen Square and NTPC Banqiao Bus Station, is located within this area.

Historical Development 

The old Banqiao Station of the Taiwan Railway was built in 1952 near the Fuzhong metro station. Before the 1990s, when the Taipei Metro did not share the commuter transportation in Greater Taipei, its daily inbound and outbound passengers reached more than 60,000 passengers, the station with the second most traffic on the entire line, after Taipei Main Station. Since the old Banqiao Station could not handle the growing number of passengers, and the surrounding hinterland was limited, the area around the station was purchased by the Taipei County Government to build the new Banqiao Station (while the railway was underground). The above area covers an area of about 19 hectares, which was the earliest prototype of the Xinban Special District. The scope and planning of the Xinban Special District was later upgraded to the current 54-hectare area with reference to the research conclusions of the Institute of Architecture and Urban-Rural Development of National Taiwan University on the urban and rural development of Taipei County to construct a CBD on the west bank of Tamsui River, and promote the relocation of the former Taipei County Government Building in Fuzhong.

There are currently 5 department stores in Xinban Special District, forming the Xinban Commercial District. Department stores in the commercial district include Far Eastern Department Store, Global Mall Banqiao Station, Mega City, Eslite Bookstore Xinban Store, and Hi Mall. Since 2010, Xinban Special District also hosts the annual Christmasland in New Taipei City, which is Taiwan's largest Winter Festival, attracting up to 6 million visitors annually.

Main Buildings

Transportation

Rail
 Metro
Taipei Metro
Bannan line : Banqiao station
Circular line : Banqiao station
 Taiwan Railways Administration
Taiwan Trunk Line: Banqiao station

Road 
Provincial Highway 3
Provincial Highway 64
Xianmin Boulevard
Hansheng East Road

Gallery

See also 
 Xinyi Planning District
 Xinzhuang Sub-city Center
 Taoyuan Zhongzheng Arts and Cultural Business District
 Qingpu Special District
 Urban planning

References 

Banqiao District
Central business districts in Taiwan
Economy of New Taipei
Planned cities in Taiwan